Vsevolods Zeļonijs (born February 24, 1973 in Riga) is a Latvian judoka, who competed in the 1992 and 2000 Summer Olympics winning bronze medal in 2000 in the lightweight (– 73 kg) category.

Zeļonijs also won the bronze medal in the 1997 World Championships, and several silver and bronze medals in European Championships. He is a four-time Olympian.

References

External links
 
 
 

1973 births
Living people
Latvian male judoka
Judoka at the 1992 Summer Olympics
Judoka at the 2000 Summer Olympics
Judoka at the 2004 Summer Olympics
Judoka at the 2008 Summer Olympics
Olympic judoka of Latvia
Olympic bronze medalists for Latvia
Sportspeople from Riga
Olympic medalists in judo
Medalists at the 2000 Summer Olympics
Goodwill Games medalists in judo
Competitors at the 1994 Goodwill Games
Latvian people of Russian descent